Uxía (born November 19, 1962 in Sanguiñeda, Mos) is a musician from Galicia, Spain. Her songs are based on traditional music, reinterpreted with a renewed and personal treatment. Among other projects, she is the artistic director and an alumna of the International Lusophone Festival, Cantos na Maré.

Discography

Albums
Foliada de marzo (Edigal), 1986
A estrela de maio (Edigal), 1987, with Na Lúa
Ondas do mar de Vigo (GASA), 1989, with Na Lúa
Entre cidades (Sons Galiza), 1991
Estou vivindo no ceo (Nubenegra), 1995
La sal de la vida (Nubenegra), 1997, with Rasha, María Salgado and Xesús Pimentel
Danza das areas, (Virgin), 2000
Cantos na maré (Nordesía), 2005, with Chico César, Filipa Pais, Manecas Costa, Astra Harris, Xabier Díaz and Jon Luz
Eterno navegar (Harmonía Mundi. World Village), 2008
Meu canto (Fol Música), 2011
Andando a terra (Fundación Manuel María), 2012, about poems of Manuel María
 Rosalía pequeniña (Galaxia/Sonárbore), 2013
 Baladas da Galiza imaxinaria (Edicións Damadriña), 2015, with Fran Pérez (Narf)
 Canta o cuco, Editorial Galaxia, 2015, with Magín Blanco
 Uxía canta a Manuel María, Fundación Manuel María, 2015
 UXIA-O, Fundación Uxío Novoneyra, 2017

Collaborations
Lo bueno, dentro (1995) by Víctor Coyote
Emilio Rúa (2000) by Emilio Rúa
Alma de buxo (2001) by Susana Seivane
Que o pano non-me namora (2002) by Malvela
Komunikando (2003) by Diplomáticos de Montealto
Aghinaldo (2004) by Malvela
Vida miña (2006) by Emilio Rúa
Da miña xanela á túa (2007) by Malvela
Na flor dos meus anos (2007) by Señora Carmen
Acácia (2007) by Mingo Rangel
O coraçao tem três portas (2007) by Dulce Pontes
Etxea (2008) by Kepa Junquera
Alalá do Cebreiro (2009) by Brañas Folk
Terra de soños (2009) by Fuxan os Ventos
Interior (2010) by Emilio Rúa
Cores do Atlântico (2010), by Socorro Lira

Compilations albums
A Cantar con Xabarín Vol. III (CRTVG, 1996)
All Children in School, All Cultures Together (Fundación Audrey Hepburn, 1997) with Omara Portoundo, Susana Baca, Teresa Salgueiro, Caetano Veloso and Dulce Pontes
Cantigas de Nadal (Boa, 1998) with Berrogüetto, A Quenlla, Xistra De Coruxo, Os Cempes, Leilía, Maite Dono, Pancho Alvarez, Muxicas, Na Lúa and Chouteira
Galicia, terra única (Xacobeo, 1999)
Spain in My Heart: Songs of the Spanish Civil War (Appleseed Records, 2003) with Arlo Guthrie, Michele Greene, John McCutcheo, Guardabarranco, Lila Downs, Aoife Clancy, Joel Rafael & Jamaica Rafael, Elixeo Parra, Quetzal and Laurie Lewis
Euskadi Galiziarekin/Galicia con Euskadi (Radio Euskadi, 2003)
Marea de Música (Boa, 2003)
Hadas (Factoría Author, 2004) with Mercedes Peón, Marina Rossell, Mestisay, María del Mar Bonet, Ginesa Ortega and Faltriqueira
Meniños cantores (Pontenasondas, Pai música and Casa de Tolos, 2006)
A Terra do Zeca: Tributo a Jose Afonso (Som Livre, 2007), with Terra d'Agua + Dulce Pontes, Filipa Pais, Lúcia Moniz and Maria Anadon
La tierra del agua (Limón Records, 2007) with Leilía, Budiño, Niño Josele and Hip Hop Roots
España (Putumayo World Music, 2009) with Peret, Gertrudis, DePedro, Burguitos, Calima, Gossos, El Combolinga, Xabier Lete, Gecko Turner, Biella Nuei
Compositoras (Vol. I) (Tratore, 2010) com Cristina Saraiva, Etel Frota, Simone Guimarães and Socorro Lira
Cantigas do Camiño (Boa, 2010)
 CoraSons'' (Kalandraka, 2012)

External links

 Uxía's Official Website
Videoclip "A lira"
"Alalá de Muxía" live

1962 births
People from Vigo (comarca)
Galician-language singers
Living people
Spanish women singers